Drosera porrecta is a tuberous perennial species in the genus Drosera that is endemic to Western Australia. It grows up to 45 cm tall. It is native to a region from Eneabba and Marchagee south to an area around Pinjarra, including the Darling Range and Mount Cooke. It grows in well-drained sandy soils and flowers from July to September.

It was first formally described by Johann Georg Christian Lehmann in 1844, though its position as a subspecies of D. stolonifera has been published. Differences in morphology and the absence of hybrids between D. stolonifera and D. porrecta suggest the current species level designation is the most appropriate choice for this taxon.

See also 
List of Drosera species

References

External links 

Carnivorous plants of Australia
Caryophyllales of Australia
Eudicots of Western Australia
Plants described in 1844
porrecta